

Ab to Ag

Ah to Al

Am to An

Ap to Ar

As to Az

 A